Mike Murphy (1946—2006) was an American professional musician. He worked with the band Chicago, Yanni and Manhattan Transfer as well as the Bee Gees.

Early life
Michael James Murphy was born 5 February 1946 in Aurora, Illinois, the son of James Owen Murphy and Mary Donna Gilman. His father was a musician and his mother was a singer and dancer with the Red Stocking Review. He began making music as a youngster with his father's band (The Jimmy Murphy Band). During high school he was a drummer in the Vaqueros Drum and Bugle Corps. The Vaqueros disbanded in 1963 but he was a major influence in their drum section. He was in the band at East Aurora High School and was a quarterback on their football team, graduating in 1964.  After a year at Doan College in Nebraska, he joined the U.S. Navy and served as an instructor in the Navy School of Music. He returned to Aurora in the early 1970s, married, had three children and became an instructor at the Fox Valley Raiders Drum And Bugle Corps and was on their board of directors

Career

He was a professional musician in both Chicago and Los Angeles as a studio drummer, jingle producer, educator, live performer, and manufacturer, serving as Operations Director for DW drums. He toured five years with the Grammy Award-winning band Chicago as a drum and computer technician, bridging the gap into digital technology, developing protocol for use of sequencing in live performance; executing the same for Yanni and Manhattan Transfer.

Bee Gees
In 1989, Murphy was the drummer for the Bee Gees in their concerts in Australia, supporting their 1989 One for All World Tour promoting their album One.  They performed on four continents for a total of twenty-five concerts (eleven in Europe, six in Australia, two in Japan, and six in the U.S. He also performed with them on their four-CD box set, Tales from the Brothers Gibb. He appears on the "One for All Tour concert film". He later married one of the backing vocalists/percussionists from the Bee Gees' One For All tour, Tampa Lann. He continued to live in California for many years.

Murphy also recorded additional drums with the Bee Gees on their 1992 American hit single "When He's Gone" wherein future Eagles backup drummer and percussionist Scott Crago played the mainline drums. Trevor Murrell became the Bee Gees' drummer in 1992.

Later life and death
Murphy moved to Cleveland, Ohio in 1994, to support his wife as caregiver for her mother. He became a custom integrator of audio, video, lighting, and security systems. He died from a lung complication on April 11, 2006. He was buried at Knollwood Cemetery in Mayfield Heights, Ohio, on April 18, 2006.

References

1946 births
2006 deaths
Burials at Knollwood Cemetery